Charles Calvert (12 June 1825 – 9 April 1882) was an English cricketer. He played five first-class matches for Cambridge University Cricket Club between 1848 and 1849.

See also
 List of Cambridge University Cricket Club players

References

External links
 

1825 births
1882 deaths
English cricketers
Cambridge University cricketers
Cricketers from Greater London
Marylebone Cricket Club cricketers